Fuck me may refer to:

 slang for requesting another to have sexual intercourse with the requestor
 slang for having pressure or stress applied to a degree that is unrecoverable
 fuck-me shoes, a type of footwear suggesting a desire to have sex
 Baise-moi, a 2000 French thriller film
 "Love Me" (Stooshe song) (originally titled "Fuck Me"), song by Stooshe

See also
 Screwed (disambiguation)
 Fuck (disambiguation)
 Fuck Me I'm Famous, series of electronic dance music compilation albums by the French DJ David Guetta in collaboration with his wife Cathy Guetta
 "Fuck Me, Ray Bradbury", a song by Rachel Bloom
 "If U Seek Amy" a Britney Spears song whose title references this phrase